Province class may refer to:

 , also called the Dhofar class, a class of fast attack craft built in the United Kingdom for Oman
 , also called the Canada class, a cancelled proposed class of nuclear-powered submarines for the Canadian Forces of Canada
 , a defunct proposed class of destroyer for Canada to be the replacement for the Iroquois-class destroyers

See also
 City class (disambiguation)
 Town class (disambiguation)